Bouchaib or Bouchaïb may refer to:

Bouchaib Abdelhadi, musician born in Casablanca, Morocco
Bouchaïb El Ahrach (born 1972), Moroccan football referee
Bouchaib Arroub (born 1936), Moroccan army general
Bouchaib Belkaid (born 1967), Moroccan sprinter
Bouchaib Benlabsir (1931–1991), Moroccan civil servant and politician
Mohamed Bouchaïb (born 1984) is an Libya-born and Algerian actor
Bouchaib El-Maachi (1943–1998), Moroccan sprinter
Bouchaib El Moubarki (born 1978), former Moroccan footballer
Bouchaib Rmail (born 1951), former director of the Direction Général de Sûreté Nationale
Bouchaib Zeroual (born 1917), Moroccan former sports shooter

See also
Bouch
Bucha (disambiguation)
Buchi (disambiguation)